Deaf Smith & Johnny Ears, also known as Los Amigos, is a 1973 Spaghetti Western film starring Anthony Quinn and Franco Nero. The film is loosely based on the life of Deaf Smith, with direction by Paolo Cavara.

Plot
The Republic of Texas has just gained its independence from Mexico. President Sam Houston sends Erastus "Deaf" Smith, a deaf-mute, and his partner Johnny Ears to stop General Morton's plot against the USA's annexation of Texas.

Their contact, a man named McDonald, and most of his family have been massacred by Morton and his men before they arrive. McDonald's surviving daughter, Hester, is married to Morton, and when Smith convinces her of the truth, she helps them overhear a German diplomat promise Morton a new supply of weapons.

They have a saloon fight with Morton's gang. Johnny recognizes a prostitute in a brothel, Suzie Q, whom he had seen bathing in a river. Deaf pays so that his partner can spend a night with her. Johnny gets jealous of her other customers, but when she suggests they leave together using her money, he says that Deaf needs him; though he later refuses to go on with the mission because he is in love, and hits Deaf.

Stealing dynamite from Morton's fort, Deaf is almost given away by the bells on a prostitute's garter, a gift he had kept in his pocket and forgotten about. He is then pursued into a cave by three men, killing one of them in a sneak attack by throwing his knife. As he comes out of the cave, he sees the corpses of the other two men, killed by Johnny. Deaf gestures in jest that Johnny still owes him a punch.

They set a trap with explosives to blow up the German's weapons transport, but stop the explosion when they see children playing near the wagon train. Instead, they infiltrate Morton's fort and kill his men with explosives and the new weapon, a machine gun that Deaf can handle because he read the lips of the instructor. Johnny gives his gun to Morton for a shoot out with Deaf. Morton is killed.

Susie leaves with Johnny and Deaf. The next morning, Deaf is gone, having left Johnny his watch. Johnny cries out his name.

Cast

Production

Director Paolo Cavara did not consider the film a spaghetti Western, instead calling it a "psychological western". He used a portable 35mm Arriflex camera.

Reception
In his investigation of narrative structures in Spaghetti Western films, Fridlund discusses this film as a variation of the partnership plot that was used in many Spaghetti Westerns following the success of For a Few Dollars More. In contrast to that story, wherein the bounty hunter partners initially have a fight and one is later revealed to have a secret vengeance motive, the two protagonists of Deaf Smith & Johnny Ears form a steady bond from the beginning. Johnny acquires a secondary motive—a love interest—and their partnership is peacefully dissolved in the end. Otherwise this is basically a professional story that concentrates on the problems of heroes and the methods they employ to reach their goals; especially the conditions arising from Smith's deafness.

See also

List of films featuring the deaf and hard of hearing

References

External links 
 
 

1973 films
1973 Western (genre) films
1970s buddy films
Italian buddy films
English-language Italian films
Films about deaf people
Films directed by Paolo Cavara
Films set in the 1830s
Spaghetti Western films
Metro-Goldwyn-Mayer films
1970s Italian films